Johan Raid (born Johan Reinhold; 22 June 1885 – 4 July 1964) was an Estonian politician and civil servant.

Raid was born in Ranna Parish (now Peipsiääre Parish), Kreis Dorpat, in the Governorate of Livonia. From 1931 until 1932, he was Minister of Justice and Internal Affairs. During the German occupation of Estonia, from 1941 until 1944, Laid served as a department chief in the Directorate for Internal Affairs of the Estonian Self-Administration of Generalbezirk Estland. In 1944, as the Red Army was approaching, Laid fled to Sweden. He died in Uppsala in 1964, aged 79.

References

1885 births
1964 deaths
People from Peipsiääre Parish
People from Kreis Dorpat
Estonian Lutherans
Farmers' Assemblies politicians
Government ministers of Estonia
Justice ministers of Estonia
Estonian Self-Administration
Estonian World War II refugees
Estonian emigrants to Sweden